1984 presidential election may refer to:

 1984 Algerian presidential election
 1984 Burundian presidential election
 1984 Cameroonian presidential election
 1984 Comorian presidential election
 1984 Salvadoran presidential election
 1984 Icelandic presidential election
 1984 Seychellois presidential election
 1984 United States presidential election
 1984 Uruguayan presidential election
 1984 Zairean presidential election